Samuel Groves (c. 1817 – 20 October 1858) was a British organ builder based in London.

Family

He was born in Cerne Abbas, Dorset

He married Elizabeth (c. 1807 – 21 March 1853)

He married Emma Barrows Lockington in 1854.

Career

He was apprenticed to Gray and Davison for 10 years, and then set up his own business around 1849 with John Mitchell. They had works at 8 Great Marlborough Street, London, and 7 St Ann’s Street, Manchester.

His partnership with John Mitchell ended in 1851. Shortly afterwards his factory on Little Marlborough Street was destroyed by fire. The last business premises was 38 Euston Road, London.
 
He applied for several patents, including improvements in pneumatic apparatus for pumping or forcing air. and improvements in organs.

He died on 20 October 1858 at the Raven Hotel, St Helen’s in the county of Lancaster. On his death, the organ being installed at Vicar Lane Chapel in Coventry was completed by two of his apprentices, Charles Lloyd and Lorenzo Valentine, who later established an organ building partnership of their own.

Organs built
St Paul’s Church, Cambridge
Penrhyn Parish Church, 1846
Parliament Street Methodist Church, Nottingham 1851
Town Hall, St Helen’s, Lancashire
Providence Congregational Church, High Street, Rochdale
St Mary Woolnoth 1851 Repairs and alterations
Southwell Minster 1854 Overhaul
St Stephen's (Huntingdonians) Chapel, Rochdale and Middleton 1854
Nottingham Mechanics' Institution 1854 repairs and enlargement
Baptist Church, Aldeburgh, Suffolk
St Chad’s Church, Rochdale 1855
Congregational Chapel, Mossley, Greater Manchester 1855
Bethel Chapel, Bury, Greater Manchester 1855
Dartford Church 1856
Great Meeting Chapel, Leicester 1856
Thornton Church, Yorkshire 1856
St. Mary's Church, Radcliffe on Trent, Nottinghamshire 1856
Mr George Simpson's Musical Academy, High Street, Hanley, Staffordshire 1856
St Mary's Church, Attenborough 1857
St. Mark's Church, Nottingham 1857
St George's Church, Leicester 1857 rebuild
Chirbury Church, Shropshire 1857
Vicar Lane Congregational Chapel, Coventry 1858 Finished by his apprentices Charles Lloyd and Lorenzo Valentine

References

British pipe organ builders
Organ builders of the United Kingdom
1858 deaths
Year of birth uncertain